PWC may refer to:

Organisations
 Agility Logistics, formerly Public Warehousing Co
 Philippine Women's College, former name of Philippine Women's University, a co-educational institution in Davao City, Philippines
 PowerWater, formerly Power and Water Corporation, government owned corporation in the Northern Territory, Australia
 Pratt & Whitney Canada, a manufacturer of small turboprops and turbofans
 Prince of Wales' College, Moratuwa, a boys' school in Moratuwa, Sri Lanka
 Prince of Wales College, a defunct university college in Charlottetown, Prince Edward Island, Canada
 PwC, a Big Four accounting firm

Other uses
 Paragliding World Cup, a paragliding competition
 Pembroke Welsh Corgi, a dog breed
 Personal water craft, a recreational watercraft
 Pirelli World Challenge, a North American auto racing series
 Prince William County, Virginia, US
 Proto-West Caucasian, sometimes used for the reconstructed proto-language of the Northwest Caucasian languages
 PWC, a catalogue of the musical works of Pachelbel